"If You're Gonna Walk, I'm Gonna Crawl" is a song written by Larry Bastian and Buddy Cannon, and recorded by American country music artist Sammy Kershaw.  It was released in March 1995 as the fourth single from the album Feelin' Good Train.  The song reached #18 on the Billboard Hot Country Singles & Tracks chart.

Chart performance

References

1995 singles
1994 songs
Sammy Kershaw songs
Songs written by Buddy Cannon
Song recordings produced by Buddy Cannon
Song recordings produced by Norro Wilson
Mercury Records singles
Songs written by Larry Bastian